Smith & Gray Company Building was an edifice which was erected in Brooklyn, New York in 1888. Designed by architect Peter J. Lauritzen, the building was eight stories tall. It was situated on an odd shaped lot at the intersection of Fulton Street and Nevins Street and Flatbush Avenue. It burned almost entirely in the early part of 1892. The establishment was distinguished by a pair of towers, more than 210 feet high, with a large clock which was illuminated at night. During the fire the clock tower fell down to Fulton Street, destroying the elevated station there. The Brooklyn Eagle said the tower was the "standard of its time" for the area it was in.

Rebuilding began by Smith & Gray in 1893. Part of a three-story structure at the angled corner was planned to rise to ten stories. In several years a seventeen-story structure, a 225 foot high tower, accompanied the new edifice. It faced Nevins Street with an 18-foot-wide clock. In February 2005 only seven floors of the seventeen story tower remained.

References

Burned buildings and structures in the United States
Commercial buildings completed in 1888
Commercial buildings completed in 1893
Demolished buildings and structures in Brooklyn
Downtown Brooklyn
History of Brooklyn